is a Japanese dancer and actor.

Biography
Tanaka was trained in ballet and modern dance, but in 1974, turned his back on these forms. He began his solo career with a series of nearly-naked primarily outdoor improvisational dances that took place throughout Japan, often dancing up to five times a day.  For a time in the 1980s, he was associated with Hijikata Tatsumi and butoh, a loose genre of Japanese dance, but now has broken from that framework as well, and no longer uses that term to describe his dances.

From 1986 to 2010, Tanaka hosted dance workshops based in Body Weather, a movement ideology which "conceives of the body as a force of nature: omni-centered, anti-hierarchic, and acutely sensitive to external stimuli." In 1985, Tanaka and his colleagues founded Body Weather Farm, located four hours west of Tokyo, where he taught summer sessions lasting four to five weeks in Japanese and English. Much of the training workshop students received was centered on the labor of workaday tasks, primarily in agriculture. Tanaka taught that performing such tasks in their environments and with their accompanying physical stimulations functioned as a dance student's teacher itself, overturning the tradition of the environment taking on a subordinate role to the dance student's technique.　He received the Chevalier of l'ordre des Arts et des Lettres from the French government in 1989 or 1990.

He continues to experiment with new ways to use the body, including drawing inspiration from farming.  Starting in 2002, he began to appear in movies and on television. He won the award for best supporting actor at the 26th Japan Academy Film Prize for The Twilight Samurai.

Filmography

Films

Television

References

External links
 
 
 

1945 births
Japanese male actors
Japanese male dancers
Living people
People from Tokyo
Male actors from Tokyo